John Tabinaman (c. 1952 – 7 November 2021) was the Acting President of the Autonomous Region of Bougainville, in Papua New Guinea, from 7 June 2008 to 6 January 2009.

Political career

As Vice President
Tabinaman was a member of the regional House of Representatives for Mahari constituency, elected in 2005 with 42.9 percent of the vote in a five-way race. Tabinaman was sworn in as Vice President of Bougainville on 15 May 2007 and also held the ministerial portfolios for Public Service, Planning and Implementation, and Peace and Autonomy. He succeeded Joseph Watawi, who was demoted after an incident of public drunkenness at Amun village caused a major scandal.

As Acting President
Following the death of Bougainville President Joseph Kabui on 7 June 2008, Tabinaman took over as Acting President until a new election was held. Tabinaman said that the existing procedure of holding a new popular election would probably be followed, while also noting the possibility of a constitutional amendment that would instead allow Parliament to elect one of its members as president. Planning for a new popular election subsequently began; it was held in December 2008, with James Tanis emerging as the winner.

References

External links
Islands Business: ABG names new vice-president

1952 births
2021 deaths
Vice-presidents of the Autonomous Region of Bougainville
Presidents of the Autonomous Region of Bougainville
Members of the Bougainville House of Representatives
21st-century Papua New Guinean politicians